Kathleen E. Halvorsen (born 1961) is an American environmental scientist whose research interests include biofuels, indigenous stewardship, public participation in land use decision-making, and climate change mitigation. She is Associate Vice President for Research Development University Professor Chair of Natural Resource Policy at Michigan Technological University, where she holds a joint appointment in the Department of Social Sciences and the College of Forest Resources and Environmental Science.

Education and career
Halvorsen studied the political economy of natural resources at the University of California, Berkeley, graduating in 1989. After earning a master's degree in environmental science at the State University of New York College of Environmental Science and Forestry in 1992, she completed a Ph.D. in forest resource management in 1996 at the University of Washington.

She joined Michigan Tech in 1995 as an instructor, became a regular-rank faculty member in 1996, and was named University Professor in 2019. She served as the executive director of the International Association for Society and Natural Resources for 2018–2020, and became associate vice president at Michigan Tech in 2019.

Recognition
Michigan Tech gave Halvorsen their annual Research Award in 2014.

References

External links
Home page

1961 births
Living people
Environmental scientists
University of California, Berkeley alumni
State University of New York College of Environmental Science and Forestry alumni
University of Washington alumni
Michigan Technological University faculty